Barcoongere River, a watercourse of the Wooli Wooli River catchment, is located in the Northern Rivers region of New South Wales, Australia.

Course and features
Barcoongere River rises below Browns Knob near Milleara, and flows generally north northeast before reaching its confluence with the Wooli Wooli River west of Wooli; descending  over its  course.

See also

 Rivers of New South Wales
 Rivers in Australia

References

 

Rivers of New South Wales
Northern Rivers